Our Lady of Mercy Church of Buenos Aires is an Argentine Catholic church. It is located on Calle Reconquista corner of Tte. Gen. Juan Domingo Perón Street, in the neighborhood of San Nicolas in Buenos Aires.

History 

The current façade is the work of the architect Mario Buschiazzo, who completed the remodeling in 1900.

Like other religious buildings of the time, the church also had a cemetery, where a large number of Buenos Aires residents, politicians and soldiers were buried. Curiously, the Merced Cemetery was located in the place where the Anglican Cathedral of St. John the Baptist of Buenos Aires was built in 1830.

Gallery

References 

18th-century Roman Catholic church buildings in Argentina
20th-century Roman Catholic church buildings in Argentina
Roman Catholic churches completed in 1900
Christianity in Buenos Aires
Buildings and structures in Buenos Aires
Baroque church buildings in Argentina